Lidia Malakhova (born ) is a Russian female  track cyclist. She competed in the team pursuit event at the 2014 UCI Track Cycling World Championships.

Career results
2011
3rd Team Pursuit, UEC European U23 Track Championships (with Elena Lichmanova and Alexandra Goncharova)
2012
1st Team Pursuit, UEC European U23 Track Championships (with Elena Lichmanova and Galina Streltsova)
2014
2nd Points Race, Memorial of Alexander Lesnikov
2015
3rd Omnium, Memorial of Alexander Lesnikov
2016
Memorial of Alexander Lesnikov
1st Points Race
2nd Scratch Race

References

External links
 Profile at cyclingarchives.com

1991 births
Living people
Russian track cyclists
Russian female cyclists
Place of birth missing (living people)